The Prins Willem, also spelled Prins Willim, was a 17th-century East Indiaman of the Dutch East India Company. She was their largest ship at the time. The ship made her first voyage to the Dutch East Indies in 1651. After several voyages, she sank near Madagascar in 1662. A replica of the Prins Willem was built in 1985, but she was destroyed by fire in 2009.

History
The ship Prins Willim was built in 1650 in Middelburg in the Dutch Republic.
Curiously, the name on the ship was Prins Willim. Two possible reasons have been advanced: the ship's name is Middle Dutch or the lack of space for the name caused the "e" to be changed to a shorter "i".

The ship was the flagship of Witte de With in the Battle of the Kentish Knock during the First Anglo-Dutch War.

The ship sank near Madagascar in 1662.

Replicas 

In the same period as the building of the original ship also a replica in 1:50 scale was built. This model still survives and is on permanent exhibition in the Dutch national museum Rijksmuseum Amsterdam. In 1978 this model was fully restorated and a replica of the same scale was constructed.

A full size replica with the same name was built in 1984–85 at the Dutch shipyard Amels in Makkum for the  theme park in Seihi, Nagasaki Prefecture, Japan. The building cost was 1.4 billion yen.

In 2003, Huis Ten Bosch K. K., the operating company of Nagasaki Holland Village declared bankruptcy and the replica was sold to a Dutch company for 130 million yen.

In 2004, the replica became part of the theme park Cape Holland in Den Helder, the Netherlands.

In 2009, the bowsprit of the Prins Willim replica was being restored.

On the morning of 30 July 2009, the replica was lost to fire, probably due to an electric malfunction. The owner of the ship, the Libéma company, decided on a restoration.
In 2014 the ship was dismantled, as the restoration turned out to be too expensive.

References

External links
 

Merchant ships of the Netherlands
Replica ships
Ships of the Dutch East India Company